Artvin Hopaspor is a Turkish football club from Hopa, Artvin Province which plays in the TFF Third League. The clubs plays in white and purple kits, and have done so since their formation in 1961.

League participations
 TFF Second League: 1996–2002
 TFF Third League: 1992–1996, 2002–2008

Stadium
Currently the team plays at the 3,000 seat capacity Hopa Şehir Stadı.

References

External links
 Official website
 Artvin Hopaspor on TFF.org

Football clubs in Turkey
1961 establishments in Turkey
Association football clubs established in 1961
Sport in Artvin